The Colegio Inglaterra Real de Chapinero is a private school located in Chapinero, Bogotá, Colombia  it was founded in 2008 by Gustavo Mendez Hernandez and his wife.

History 
After the close of the Liceo Parroquial Divino Salvador in 2007 the parents of the students wanted a good school, the Hermana Margarota Rozo looked at the  possibility of opening a new school but it was impossible.

Then the Hermana Margarita Rozo asked Gladys Parada who was the principal of the Suba's English Royal School about the possibility of opening a franchise in the locality of Chapinero, as Gladys Parada could not be a principal of two schools, her husband could direct it.

So a franchise of the English Royal School in Chapinero was formed and in 2007 the principal Gustavo Mendez Hernandez was appointed and on February 1, 2008 the new year started with 250 students.

In 2021 cause of the COVID-19 pandemic the school couldn’t maintain itself and closed.

Principals 
 Gustavo Mendez Hernandez: Principal, Founder
 Gladys Parada: co-founder
 Maritza Caldas: vice-principal

Schools in Bogotá
2008 establishments in Colombia
Educational institutions established in 2008